Waves: Radio 1 Sessions 90–94 is an album compiling tracks recorded for BBC radio sessions by British band Ride, released in 2003.

Track listing
"Like a Daydream" – 2:53
"Dreams Burn Down" – 6:25
"Perfect Time" – 3:37
"Sight of You" (Pale Saints cover)– 5:44
"All I Can See" – 3:14
"Decay" – 4:18
"Severance" (Dead Can Dance cover) – 3:30
"Time of Her Time" – 3:32
"Not Fazed" – 3:40
"Mousetrap" – 5:16
"Birdman" – 5:37
"Walk on Water" – 4:16
"Since Then" – 4:14
"Crown of Creation" – 4:38
"Let's Get Lost" – 3:49
"1000 Miles" – 4:56
"I Don't Know Where It Comes From" – 5:49

References

External links
The First Time Records website
 

Ride (band) albums
BBC Radio recordings
2003 live albums
2003 compilation albums